In molecular biology, the condensation domain is a protein domain found in many multi-domain enzymes which synthesise peptide antibiotics. This domain catalyses a condensation reaction to form peptide bonds in non-ribosomal peptide biosynthesis. It is usually found to the carboxy side of a phosphopantetheine binding domain (pp-binding). It has been shown that mutations in the HHXXXDG sequence motif in this domain abolish activity suggesting this is part of the active site.

References

Protein families